Harbans Kapoor (7 January 1946 – 13 December 2021) was an Indian politician who was a senior leader of the Bharatiya Janata Party (BJP) in Uttarakhand State. He was Speaker of the Uttarakhand Legislative Assembly from 2007 to 2012. He was elected to the assembly from Dehra Khas constituency. After the first defeat in 1985, he never lost Legislative Assembly elections and won for a record eight terms in a row (four times as the member of the Uttar Pradesh Legislative Assembly and four as the member of the Uttarakhand Legislative Assembly) from Dehradun.

Early life and education
Kapoor was born in Bannu, North-West Frontier Province in 1946 to a Hindkowan Hindu family. His family settled in Dehradun after Partition of India. He completed his early schooling from St. Joseph's Academy, Dehradun. He graduated in Law from D.A.V. Post Graduate College, Dehradun.

Politics
Starting as a grass root level politician, he joined the Uttar Pradesh Vidhan Sabha in 1989 as a member of the 10th Uttar Pradesh Vidhan Sabha from Dehradun constituency, followed by the 11th Vidhan Sabha, 12th Vidhan Sabha and the 13th Vidhan Sabha. He also maintained his victory in the first election of the new state of Uttarakhand in 2002 and continued his victory spree in all the elections after the inception. In 2007, he was unanimously elected the Speaker of  Uttarakhand Assembly. He was one of the oldest leaders in Uttarakhand BJP.

Later life
Kapoor died on 13 December 2021, at the age of 75 at his home in Dehradun from COVID-19.

Positions held

Elections contested

References

1946 births
2021 deaths
Members of the Uttarakhand Legislative Assembly
Speakers of the Uttarakhand Legislative Assembly
People from Bannu District
Uttar Pradesh MLAs 1989–1991
Uttar Pradesh MLAs 1991–1993
Uttar Pradesh MLAs 1993–1996
Uttar Pradesh MLAs 1997–2002
Uttarakhand MLAs 2002–2007
Uttarakhand MLAs 2007–2012
Uttarakhand MLAs 2012–2017
Uttarakhand MLAs 2017–2022
Bharatiya Janata Party politicians from Uttarakhand
Deaths from the COVID-19 pandemic in India